Lloyd Gough (born Michael Gough; September 21, 1907 – July 23, 1984) was an American theater, film, and television actor.

Life and career 
Born Michael Gough in New York City, he was a noted character actor.

Married to actress-turned-activist Karen Morley, both were brought before the House Un-American Activities Committee and when they invoked the Fifth Amendment they were blacklisted, effectively terminating their careers in Hollywood until the late 1960s.

In 1952, he appeared as the main villain in Rancho Notorious, but his name was removed from the credits due to the blacklist.

In 1966, he played Richard Bayler in the Perry Mason episode, "The Case of the Scarlet Scandal". Also in 1966, he played open minded fur hunter “Jacob Beamus” in S11E29's “The Treasure of John Walking Fox” on Gunsmoke.

Gough played Daily Sentinel crime reporter Mike Axford in the TV series The Green Hornet in 1966–67. In 1967, he guest-starred on Mannix as Senator Miniver in the episode “Turn Every Stone.”

He would later appear in a film about the Hollywood blacklist period, The Front (1976); his name was accompanied by his blacklist date.

Gough was married to Morley from 1943 until his death in 1984 from an aortic aneurysm at the age of 76. They had one child.

Filmography 
His films and shows include:

 Body and Soul  (1947) - Roberts
 Black Bart (1948) - Sheriff Gordon
 All My Sons (1948) - Jim Bayliss
 River Lady (1948) - Mike Riley
 The Babe Ruth Story (1947) - Gambler Dalton
 A Southern Yankee (1948) - Capt. Steve Lorford
 That Wonderful Urge (1948) - Duffy - Chronicle Editor
 Tulsa (1949) - Bruce Tanner
 Roseanna McCoy (1949) - Phamer McCoy
 Always Leave Them Laughing (1949) - Monte Wilson
 Tension (1950) - Barney Deager
 Outside the Wall (1950) - Red Chaney
 Sunset Boulevard (1950) - Morino
 Storm Warning (1951) - Cliff Rummel
 Valentino (1951) - Eddie Morgan
 The Scarf (1951) - Dr. Gordon
 Rancho Notorious (1952) - Kinch (uncredited)
 Kentucky Jones (Episode "Wildcat Soup," 1964) - Mr. Baxter
 The Green Hornet (1966) - Mike Axford
 Tony Rome (1967) - Jules Langley
 Madigan (1968) - Earl Griffin
 The Sweet Ride (1968) - Parker
 Funny Girl (1968) - Bill Fallon, Lawyer (uncredited)
 Tell Them Willie Boy Is Here (1969) - Dexter
 The Great White Hope (1970) - Smitty
 My Old Man's Place (1971) - Dr. Paul
 Cannon (TV) Murder by Moonlight (1972)
 Executive Action (1973) - Charlie McCadden
 Earthquake (1974) - Cameron
 The Front (1976) - Herbert Delaney
 The Private Files of J. Edgar Hoover (1977) - Walter Winchell
 House Calls (1978) - Harry Grady

References

External links

 
 
 

1907 births
1984 deaths
Male actors from New York City
American male film actors
American male stage actors
American male television actors
Hollywood blacklist
Deaths from aortic aneurysm
20th-century American male actors
20th-century American singers